The Rhein-Main International Montessori School (abbreviation: RIMS) was a private school and one of two secondary schools in Friedrichsdorf, Hesse, Germany. The school had approximately 47 teachers and 370 students.

School 
RIMS consisted of a children's house, an elementary school and a secondary school. A secondary school was introduced in the 2008/2009 school year; however, teaching there was not based on the Montessori method.

The school had never been recognized as an examination-authorized school, so the baccalaureate examinations had to be taken at state schools. In 2014, the school hit the headlines because half of the students had failed the baccalaureate exams. Since the school had also not offered the opportunity to obtain the intermediate school-leaving certificate after the 10th grade, the failed high school graduates were left without any qualifications.

References 

Buildings and structures in Hochtaunuskreis
Gymnasiums in Germany
Bilingual schools
Montessori schools in Germany
Educational institutions established in 2003
Educational institutions disestablished in 2015
Schools in Hesse
2003 establishments in Germany
2015 disestablishments in Germany